Alfred Edgar 'Eddie' Marks (15 May 1924 – 14 February 1996) was an Irish first-class cricketer.

Born at Belfast, Marks was educated at Methodist College Belfast. Playing club cricket for North of Ireland Cricket Club and North Down in Belfast, Marks made his debut in first-class cricket for Ireland against Glamorgan at Margam during Ireland's 1953 tour of England and Wales. Two further first-class appearances for Ireland followed, both against Scotland in 1954 and 1955. He struggled with the bat in his three matches, scoring just 35 runs with a highest score of 17. In his capacity as a wicket-keeper, he took five catches and made two stumpings. Outside of cricket, he was employed as a draughtsman at Harland and Wolff shipyard. He died at Belfast in February 1996.

References

External links

1924 births
1966 deaths
Cricketers from Belfast
People educated at Methodist College Belfast
Irish cricketers